Graffiti Studio is a Bulgarian broadcast media content localization company, providing multilingual dubbing, voice over and subtitling services to the Global market. Graffiti Studio operates since 1994 and is based in Sofia, Bulgaria.

Television programs

Kanal 1
BTV (Bulgaria)
Nova Television (Bulgaria)
Discovery Channel
TLC
Cartoon Network
Disney Channel
AXN
Fashion One
Fox

Commercial localization
Omnicom
Ogilvy
BBDO

E-learning
 Microsoft
 Adobe
 Nokia
 BMW
 Volvo
 OMV
 Shell
 HP
 Sony
 Philips
 Deutsche Telekom

Film companies
 Warner Bros.

Celebretitiy actors
 Morgan Freeman
 James Frain
 Heather Stephens
 Ben Cross

See also
 Dolly Media Studio fellow dubbing based in Sofia

References

External links
 Official Site 

Mass media in Bulgaria
Mass media in Sofia